Sisak (also known by other alternative names) is a city in central Croatia, spanning the confluence of the Kupa, Sava and Odra rivers,  southeast of the Croatian capital Zagreb, and is usually considered to be where the Posavina (Sava basin) begins, with an elevation of 99 m. The city's total population in 2011 was 47,768 of which 33,322 live in the urban settlement (naselje).

Sisak is the administrative centre of the Sisak-Moslavina County, Croatia's biggest river port and a centre of river shipping industry (Dunavski Lloyd). It lies on the D36 state road and the Zagreb-Sisak-Novska railway. Sisak is a regional economic, cultural and historical center. The largest oil refinery in Croatia is here.

Name 
Prior to belonging to the Roman Empire, which gave it the Latin name Siscia, the region was Celtic and Illyrian and the city there was named Segestica or Segesta.

History

Roman empire 

Siscia is described by Roman writers as a great town in the south of Upper Pannonia, on the southern bank of the Savus, on an island formed by that river and two others, the Colapis and Odra, a canal dug by Tiberius completing the island. It was on the great road from Aemona to Sirmium. According to Pliny the name Segestica belonged only to the island, and the town was called Siscia; while Strabo says that Siscia was a fort in the neighbourhood of Segestica; but if this was so, it must be supposed that subsequently the fort and town became united as one place. Siscia was from the first a strongly fortified town; and after its capture by Tiberius, in the reign of Augustus, it became one of the most important places of Pannonia; for being on two navigable rivers, it not only carried on considerable commerce, but became the central point from which Augustus and Tiberius carried on their undertakings against the Pannonians and Illyrians. Tiberius did much to enlarge and embellish the town, which as early as that time seems to have been made a colonia, for Pliny mentions it as such: in the time of Septimius Severus it received fresh colonists, whence in inscriptions it is called Col. Septimia Siscia. The town contained an imperial mint, which produced coins under a series of emperors between 262 and 383 AD.

The Christian martyr Quirinus of Sescia, presumed the first bishop of the Diocese of Sescia, was tortured and nearly killed during Diocletian's persecution of Christians. Legend has it that they tied him to a millstone and threw him into a river, but he freed himself from the weight, escaped and continued to preach his faith. Today he is the patron saint of Sisak. When Diocletian split Pannonia into four provinces, Siscia became the capital of Pannonia Savia, the southwestern one, for which Siscia contained the treasury; at the same time it was the station of the small fleet kept on the Savus. Siscia maintained its importance until Sirmium began to rise, for in proportion as Sirmium rose, Siscia sank and declined.

Middle Ages
Braslav of Lower Pannonia reigned from Sisak until he was killed in the Hungarian invasion ca. 898. According to Historia Salonitana, Duke Tomislav reclaimed it soon after.

Early modern

The 16th-century triangular fortress of the Old Town, well-preserved and turned into the Native Museum, is the main destination of every tourist. The fortress is famous for the victory of the joint forces of Croats, Austrians and Carniolans (Slovenes) over the Ottomans in 1593, known as the Battle of Sisak. It was one of the early significant defeats of the up-to-then invincible Ottoman army on European territory. The Croatian Ban Thomas Erdődy who led the defense in this battle became famous throughout Europe. However this victory didn't prevent Sisak from Ottoman conquest in 24 August 1593. During brief rule of them, it was called Siska. Its fortress was manned, a sanjak beg was appointed and a mosque was built in the fortress.On 11 August 1594, the Ottoman garrison fled and set the fortress on fire after approaching a powerful Habsburg-Croat army to it.

The Baroque palace of Mali Kaptol, the classicist Veliki Kaptol, the brick Stari most ("Old Bridge") over the Kupa, and the ethnological park are the most frequently visited landmarks.

Modern 
In the late 19th and early 20th century, Sisak was a district capital in the Zagreb County of the Kingdom of Croatia-Slavonia.

Modern history 

From 1929 to 1939, Sisak was part of the Sava Banovina, and from 1939 to 1941, of the Banovina of Croatia within the Kingdom of Yugoslavia. During World War II, the Sisak children's concentration camp was set up by the Croatian Axis Ustaše government for Serbian, Jewish and Romani children. It is estimated that 1,160–1,600 children lost their lives at the camp.
 
On 22 June 1941, the day Germany invaded the Soviet Union, the Sisak People's Liberation Partisan Detachment, also known as the 1st Sisak Partisan Detachment, was formed by the outlawed Croatian Communist Party in the Brezovica Forest, near Sisak. It was the first Partisan armed anti-fascist resistance unit formed in occupied Yugoslavia following the invasion of Yugoslavia by the Axis powers in April 1941.
It had 79 members, mainly Croats with the exception of one notable Serb woman, Nada Dimić, and was commanded by a Croat, Vladimir Janjić-Capo.

With the outbreak of the Croatian War of Independence in 1991, Sisak remained in Government hands while the territory to the south was controlled by rebelling Serbs. During the war, the Serb forces often shelled the city, causing dozens of civilian casualties and extensive damage to the city's industry. According to Amnesty International, Serb civilians in Sisak and surrounding areas were subjected to abductions, killings, assault and threats with at least 33 killed between 1991 and 1992, while local human rights activists in Croatia claim that over 100 Serb residents of the Sisak region were killed during the entirety of the war. The frontline dramatically moved eastwards as a result of Operation Storm (1995), effectively ending the war.

Sisak suffered much damage during the 2020 Petrinja earthquake. Most of the damage was inflicted on old buildings in the center of the town. However, early figures estimate that 700 to 1,000 homes were damaged in Sisak and nearby villages.

Population 
In the 2011 census, of the total population of 47,768 there were 40,590 Croats (84.97%), 3,071 Serbs (6.43%), 1,646 Bosniaks (3.45%), 648 Romani (1.36%), 179 Albanians (0.37%), 29 Montenegrins (0.06%), and the rest were other ethnicities.
 
In the 2011 census, the population by religion was 37,319 Roman Catholics (78.13%; since 2009 again served by their own Diocese of Sisak), 3,279 Orthodox Christians (6.86%), 2,442 Muslims (5.11%) and others.

Municipal makeup 
The city's administrative area is composed of the following settlements:

 Blinjski Kut, population 278
 Budaševo, population 1,660
 Bukovsko, population 89
 Crnac, population 553
 Čigoč, population 97
 Donje Komarevo, population 322
 Gornje Komarevo, population 508
 Greda, population 861
 Gušće, population 387
 Hrastelnica, population 898
 Jazvenik, population 142
 Klobučak, population 68
 Kratečko, population 200
 Letovanci, population 52
 Lonja, population 111
 Lukavec Posavski, population 127
 Madžari, population 235
 Mužilovčica, population 74
 Novo Pračno, population 444
 Novo Selo, population 624
 Novo Selo Palanječko, population 517
 Odra Sisačka, population 814
 Palanjek, population 318
 Prelošćica, population 528
 Sela, population 969
 Sisak, population 33,049
 Stara Drenčina, population 223
 Staro Pračno, population 896
 Staro Selo, population 110
 Stupno, population 480
 Suvoj, population 42
 Topolovac, population 894
 Veliko Svinjičko, population 271
 Vurot, population 102
 Žabno, population 509

Miscellaneous 

Chief occupations are farming, ferrous metallurgy (iron works), chemicals, leather (footwear), textiles and food processing plants (dairy products, alcoholic beverages), building material, crude oil refinery and thermal power.

Sisak features the largest metallurgic factory and the largest oil refinery in Croatia.

The city hosts University of Zagreb's Faculty of Metallurgy.

Sports and recreation facilities in the town and the surroundings include mainly the waters and alluvial plains a public beach on the Kupa. All rivers (Kupa, Odra, Sava) with their backwaters offer fishing opportunities. There are hunting grounds in the regions of Turopolje and Posavina. Sisak is the starting point for sightseeing tours into Lonjsko Polje (Field of Lonja river) nature park. The local football club is HNK Segesta. Sisak features the oldest ice hockey club in Croatia, KHL Sisak est. 1934.

Geography

Climate

International relations

Twin towns – Sister cities
Sisak is twinned with:

See also 
 Sisak (eponym)
 List of people from Sisak
 Roman Catholic Diocese of Sisak

References

Bibliography

Notes

External links 

 
 Sisak News Portal
 Radio Sisak - Hometown radio station
 Sisak Tourism
 Photo Gallery of Sisak

 
Cities and towns in Croatia
Spa towns in Croatia
Populated places in Sisak-Moslavina County
Zagreb County (former)